Ashianeh-ye Sofla (also Romanized as Āshīāneh-ye Soflá, Ashiyaneh Sofla, and Āshyāneh Soflá; also known as Āshiāneh and Āshīāneh-ye Pa’īn) is a village in Hamzehlu Rural District, in the Central District of Khomeyn County, Markazi Province, Iran. 

At the 2006 census, its population was 26, in 10 families.

References 

Populated places in Khomeyn County